St. Antony's Higher Secondary School is a school in India located in Kosavapatti, Sanarpatty, Tamil Nadu. It was started as R.C. Boys Middle School and later became a high school with new buildings constructed near the primary health center. It then became a Higher Secondary School, with an enrolment of over 2,000 boys and girls. Father K. A. Arockiasamy, who served as parish priest, was instrumental in helping the school become a Higher Secondary School.

The school offers education from class 6th to Class 12th in both english and Tamil.

See also
Higher Secondary (School) Certificate

High schools and secondary schools in Tamil Nadu
Education in Madurai district